John Warren Goodson is a former professional American football player who played punter for one season for the Pittsburgh Steelers. He is known for punting barefoot.

References

1960 births
Living people
American football punters
Pittsburgh Steelers players
Texas Longhorns football players
Players of American football from Houston